Robert Albert Steiner (March 6, 1946 – February 25, 2020) was a Canadian football player who played for the Hamilton Tiger-Cats and Edmonton Eskimos. He won the Grey Cup with Hamilton in 1967.

References

1946 births
2020 deaths
Edmonton Elks players
Hamilton Tiger-Cats players
Canadian football defensive linemen